Parastagmatoptera is a genus consisting of ten species of mantises in the subfamily Vatinae.

Species
Parastagmatoptera bororoi Lombardo, Umbriaco & Ippolito, 2014
Parastagmatoptera flavoguttata Serville, 1839
Parastagmatoptera immaculata Chopard, 1911
Parastagmatoptera pellucida Giglio-Tos, 1914
Parastagmatoptera simulacrum (Fabricius, 1793)
Parastagmatoptera sottilei Lombardo, Umbriaco & Ippolito, 2014
Parastagmatoptera theresopolitana Giglio-Tos, 1914
Parastagmatoptera unipunctata Burmeister, 1838
Parastagmatoptera vitreola Stal, 1877
Parastagmatoptera zernyi Beier, 1930

See also
List of mantis genera and species

References

Stagmatopterinae
Mantodea genera